Jordan "Orce" Kamchev is a Macedonian businessman. According to Forbes, he is the richest person in North Macedonia for 2015, with net worth of 228 mil euros.

Companies
 Hospital Acibadem Sistina (2010)
 Media Print Macedonia (2004)
 Skopsko Pole
 Stopanska Banka AD Bitola
 Pelagonija Energy
 Beton Shtip
 Mont
 Orka Sport
 IBIS Skopje City Center

Controversies

Extortion Scandal 
In the summer 2020, Boki 13 and prosecutor Katica Janeva were imprisoned for money laundering and illegal influence due to their attempts to extort Kamchev for  €1.5 million.

Special Prosecution Probes 
Following the ousting of former Macedonian Prime Minister Nikola Gruevski due to corruption. Kamchev who was reportedly close to his regime has been under investigation by Macedonian prosecutors.

In March 2021, Kamchev was arrested in North Macedonia due to fears that he will try to leave the country. The arrest was in regards to allegations that Kamchev had been involved in a scheme where he purchased land in the Vodno district, Skopje using public money when VMRO-DPMNE was the ruling party.

References

1970 births
Living people
Businesspeople from Skopje